The Palm Beach Cup is a defunct WTA Tour affiliated tennis tournament played from 1982 to 1985. It was held at the Frenchman's Creek Beach & Country Club in Palm Beach Gardens, Florida in the United States and played on outdoor clay courts.

Chris Evert was the most successful player at the tournament, winning the singles competition twice.

Results

Singles

Doubles

References
 WTA Results Archive

 
Palm Beach Cup
Clay court tennis tournaments
WTA Tour
1982 establishments in Florida
1985 disestablishments in Florida
Recurring sporting events established in 1982
Recurring sporting events disestablished in 1985
Sports in Palm Beach County, Florida
Palm Beach Gardens, Florida